Hengli is a town under the jurisdiction of Dongguan prefecture-level city in the Pearl River Delta region of Guangdong province, China. It is located just north of Changping Town.

External links

Geography of Dongguan
Towns in Guangdong